The Sydney Stakes is a City Tattersalls Club Group 3 Thoroughbred horse race run under Weight for Age conditions, over a distance of 1200 metres at Randwick Racecourse, Sydney, Australia in October. Total prizemoney for the race is A$2,000,000.

History
The original name of the race was the City Tattersall’s Lightning Handicap. It was renamed in 2017 as the Sydney Stakes, for horses that are not entered in The Everest.

Grade
1968–1978 - Principal Race
1978–2017 - Listed Race
2018 onwards - Group 3

Venue
 1968–1982 - Randwick Racecourse 
 1983 - Warwick Farm Racecourse
 1984 onwards - Randwick Racecourse

Distance
1968–1971 - 5 furlongs
1972–2000 - 1000 metres
2001 - 870 metres
2002–2005 - 1000 metres
2006–2016 - 1100 metres
2017 onwards - 1200 metres

Winners

2022 - Rocketing By
2021 - Big Parade
2020 - Trumbull
2019 - Deprive
2018 - Pierata
2017 - In Her Time
2016 - Spieth
2015 - Dothraki
2014 - Deep Field
2013 - Famous Seamus
2012 - Famous Seamus
2011 - Title
2010 - Whitefriars
2009 - News Alert
2008 - Keen Commander
2007 - ‘Race Not Run’
2006 - Uber
2005 - Vionneto
2004 - Sam Sung A Song
2003 - Shogun Lodge
2002 - National Saint
2001 - ^ Pastime / Strabane
2000 - Cosset
1999 - Nan Tien
1998 - Mutombo
1997 - Ossie Cossie
1996 - Identikit
1995 - Sword
1994 - Roanoke Boy
1993 - Legal Agent
1992 - Classic Magic
1991 - All Archie
1990 - West Dancer
1989 - Diamond Benny
1988 - Diamond Benny
1987 - Dream Faith
1986 - Let Me Tell
1985 - Bemboka Spirit
1984 - Vain Karioi
1983 - Solo Lad
1982 - Berlainsky
1981 - Trench Digger
1980 - Royal Treatment
1979 - Dream Mascot
1978 - War Chariot
1977 - King’s Favourite 
1976 - ‘Race Not Run’
1975 - Top Charger
1974 - Just James
1973 - Kista
1972 - Roadwise
1971 - Hellbent
1970 - Royal Treat
1969 - Grey Court
1968 - Academy Star

^ Dead heat

See also
 List of Australian Group races
 Group races

References

 

Horse races in Australia